Besullo is a parish (administrative division) in Allande, a municipality within the province and autonomous community of Asturias, in northern Spain.

The population is 109.

Villages and hamlets
 Comba
 Forniellas ("Furniellas")
 Fuentes ("As Fontes")
 Iboyo ("Iboyu")
 Noceda

Notable people
Alejandro Casona, a Spanish dramatist and playwright, was born in Besullo.

References

External links
 Asturian society of economic and industrial studies, English language version of "Sociedad Asturiana de Estudios Económicos e Industriales" (SADEI)
 Allande 

Parishes in Allande